The Cry of Love Tour was a 1970 concert tour by American rock guitarist and singer Jimi Hendrix. It began on April 25, 1970, at the Forum in Inglewood, California, and ended on September 6, 1970, at the Love & Peace Festival in Fehmarn, West Germany. The majority of the 37 shows were in the United States, with two each in Sweden, Denmark, and West Germany, and one in England, where Hendrix was the final act at the Isle of Wight Festival 1970.

After experimenting with different lineups following the breakup of the original lineup of the Jimi Hendrix Experience, Hendrix brought back drummer Mitch Mitchell with bassist Billy Cox replacing Noel Redding to record and tour. The trio would perform older tunes along with newer material from the live Band of Gypsys album and songs that Jimi was developing for a fourth album.  Soon after their performance at the Isle of Wight, the tour was cut short due to Cox's illness and Hendrix was left considering his options.  However, he died twelve days after the Fehmarn concert.

Several concerts were recorded and filmed that were later released on albums and film.  Since their debut in 1971, the Berkeley, Atlanta, and Isle of Wight performances have been reissued several times, most recently as Blue Wild Angel: Live at the Isle of Wight (2002), Live at Berkeley (2003), and Freedom: Atlanta Pop Festival/Jimi Hendrix: Electric Church (2015).  Concert selections continue to be included on Hendrix retrospectives and documentaries, such as Voodoo Child: The Jimi Hendrix Collection (2001), which contains five songs recorded during the tour.

Background
Following Noel Redding's departure from the Experience on June 29, 1969, Hendrix called on Billy Cox, an Army buddy and early bandmate, to play bass.  In July, Hendrix, Cox, and Experience drummer Mitch Mitchell moved to a rural retreat in upstate New York and began rehearsing with an expanded lineup, which included rhythm guitarist Larry Lee and percussionists Juma Sultan and Jerry Velez.  One month later, the group debuted at the Woodstock festival. After a couple of gigs and recording sessions, it became apparent that the group, sometimes referred to as "Gypsy Sun and Rainbows" after a comment Hendrix made at Woodstock, was not making sufficient progress. Hendrix still wanted to experiment with a different backup but return to the trio configuration, so drummer Buddy Miles replaced Mitchell with Cox remaining on bass. However, the new trio, often called the Band of Gypsys, was similarly short-lived.  Hendrix's tour manager, Gerry Stickells, believed "Jimi's own lack of commitment to the Band of Gypsys concept [was] its fatal flaw".  Hendrix expressed his dissatisfaction with the subsequent Band of Gypsys live album and Cox saw it as a stopgap measure to meet a contractual obligation.  With the return of Mitchell alongside Cox, Hendrix's latest group had only one member change from either the Experience or the Band of Gypsys.

Shortly before the tour began, Hendrix was interviewed for Melody Maker, the British music magazine: "I called the tour the 'Cry of Love' because that is what it's all about", which the writer also thought was the name of the new group. However, a new name was never officially adopted, but concert promoters often billed them as the "Jimi Hendrix Experience".  Hendrix explained:

With the March–June 1970 releases in the US and UK of the Woodstock film and soundtrack and Band of Gypsys, Hendrix remained one of the biggest rock concert attractions: "I'd like to play some festivals but I wish they would break up the events a bit for the audiences.  There's no reason why these huge crowds should not be entertained by side attractions as well." During this period, demonstrations, riots, and clashes with the police occurred at several concerts. Some of Hendrix's performances were met with demands that they be free events, such at the Berkeley Community Theatre (May 30), Swing Auditorium (June 20), Ventura County Fairgrounds (June 21), and the New York Pop Festival (July 17), where they led to violent confrontations.

At this time, Hendrix was also writing and recording songs for a planned fourth studio album. In early June after many delays, his new recording facility, Electric Lady Studios, was operational.  Hendrix was able to get his manager, Michael Jeffery, to agree to limit his concert appearances to three-day weekends, so the group could return to New York City to record during the rest of the week.  There were some stretches when the group took time off: they only performed twice between May 10 and June 5 (three gigs were cancelled due to illness); and twice between June 27 and July 17.  The group spent most of August recording at Electric Lady, before the official opening party on August 26.

Afterwards, Hendrix departed for England and the European segment of the tour.  For his first appearance in England in eighteen months, Hendrix was one of the top-billed events at Isle of Wight Festival 1970.  A few dates later, Cox became ill and had to return to the US to recover.  So, after performing at only seven European concerts, the tour was cancelled.  Hendrix stayed in London, where he attended parties and jammed with other musicians.  He was considering whether to find a new bass player and met with Chas Chandler, the producer of Are You Experienced and Axis: Bold as Love. However, Hendrix died on September 18, 1970.

Repertoire

Throughout the tour, Hendrix continued to perform Experience material and introduced several newer songs.  "Purple Haze" and "Voodoo Child (Slight Return)" were frequent concert closers; "Foxey Lady", "Red House", "Fire", and "Hey Joe" were concert staples as they had been in Experience performances.  Hendrix also continued to perform popular songs that dated back to the Experience, but not yet recorded to his satisfaction, such as "Lover Man", "Hear My Train A Comin'", and "Roomful of Mirrors".  From his time with Cox and Miles, he added "Machine Gun", "Message to Love", and "Ezy Ryder".

Hendrix also had a number of new songs that were still in development that he chose to include in his concerts: "Freedom" and "Hey Baby (New Rising Sun)" were among the most played new numbers; others, such as "Straight Ahead", "In from the Storm", "Dolly Dagger", and "Midnight Lightning" were performed occasionally. The songs signaled a new direction in Hendrix's music, which biographer John McDermott describes as "music of a more mature and refined Experience... reflecting a more subtle and intricate approach".  At Atlanta Pop, where they played several new songs, Hendrix was encouraged by the audience reaction. As they left the stage, he remarked to Cox, "we must be riding in the right direction".

Set lists, which identify the songs to be performed and their order, were not used by the group. According to Cox, "We never had a set list. Jimi always starts the song off. So wherever he wanted to go, that's where we went." When he wanted to extend a song, Hendrix provided a cue, such as a head or hand gesture known to Mitchell and Cox. Biographer David Moskowitz identifies the songs performed on July 26 at the Sick's Stadium in Seattle, Washington, as representative of the Cry of Love repertoire:
"Fire"
"Message to Love"
"Lover Man"
"Machine Gun"
"The Star-Spangled Banner"
"Purple Haze"
"Hear My Train A Comin'"
"Voodoo Child (Slight Return)"
"Hey Baby (New Rising Sun)"
"Freedom"
"Red House"
"Foxey Lady"

Despite being one of his best-selling singles, Hendrix usually ignored requests for "All Along the Watchtower" during his tours with the Experience.  However, after the song's debut about midway through the tour on June 20, he performed it more often. Cox wished to delve deeper into Hendrix's catalogue: "I wanted to play those songs... I wanted him to play 'Crosstown Traffic,' but we never got around to rehearsing it."  However, Hendrix occasionally surprised him – at a May 16 gig at Temple University in Philadelphia, Pennsylvania, Cox recalled:

Hendrix also performed "Johnny B. Goode" at the first show on May 30 at the Berkeley Community Theatre. During the afternoon rehearsals, the group tried out another rock and roll classic, Carl Perkins' "Blue Suede Shoes".  In Europe, Hendrix reached back to his early career for a couple of performances of Howlin' Wolf's "Killing Floor" and the Muddy Waters tribute "Catfish Blues".

Films and albums
Over the years, several films and albums have been released of Hendrix's concert performances during the Cry of Love tour (all are albums, except where noted):
Jimi Plays Berkeley (film with songs from both shows on May 30, released 1971)
Live at Berkeley (2nd show, May 30, released 2003)
Johnny B. Goode (video & LP with songs from Berkeley on May 30 & Atlanta Pop on July 4, released 1986)
Stages (Box set disc 4: Atlanta Pop, July 4, released 1991)
Jimi Hendrix: At the Atlanta Pop Festival (film of Atlanta Pop, July 4, released 1992)
Freedom: Atlanta Pop Festival (July 4, released 2015)
Jimi Hendrix: Electric Church (film July 4, released 2015 in conjunction with Freedom)
Rainbow Bridge (film July 30, released 1971)
Live in Maui (July 30 both sets, released 2020)
Isle of Wight (August 31, released 1971)
Jimi Hendrix: At the Isle of Wight (film August 31, released 1990)
Live Isle of Wight '70 (August 31, released 1991)
Blue Wild Angel: Live at the Isle of Wight (film & CD August 31, released 2002)
Live at the Isle of Fehmarn (September 6, released 2005)
Additionally, songs recorded during the tour have been released along with other live and/or studio material:
Rainbow Bridge (1971): "Hear My Train A Comin'" (Berkeley, May 30)
Hendrix in the West (1972): "Johnny B. Goode", "Lover Man", "Blue Suede Shoes" (Berkeley, May 30); "God Save the Queen", "Sgt. Pepper's Lonely Hearts Club Band" (Isle of Wight, August 30)
Soundtrack Recordings from the Film Jimi Hendrix (film & LP 1973): "Johnny B. Goode", "Purple Haze" (Berkeley, May 30); "Machine Gun", "Red House", "In from the Storm" (Isle of Wight, August 30)
The Jimi Hendrix Concerts (1982): "Red House" (New York Pop, July 17)
Band of Gypsys 2 (1986): "Voodoo Child" (Atlanta Pop, July 4); "Stone Free", "Ezy Ryder" (Berkeley, May 30)
Cornerstones: 1967–1970 (1990): "Fire", "Stone Free" (Atlanta Pop, July 4)
Blues (1994): "Hear My Train A Comin (Berkeley, May 30)
The Jimi Hendrix Experience (2000): "Johnny B. Goode", "Blue Suede Shoes" (Berkeley, May 30); "Hey Baby" / "In from the Storm" (Maui, July 30); "All Along the Watchtower", "In from the Storm" (Isle of Wight, August 30)
Voodoo Child: The Jimi Hendrix Collection (2001): "Hear My Train A Comin, "Johnny B. Goode" (Berkeley, May 30); "Red House" (New York Pop, July 17); "Foxey Lady" (Maui, July 30); "Freedom" (Isle of Wight, August 30)
West Coast Seattle Boy: The Jimi Hendrix Anthology (2010): "Red House" (Berkeley, May 30)
Voodoo Child (film 2010, released with West Coast Seattle Boy): portions of "Machine Gun", "Hey Baby", "Purple Haze" (Berkeley, May 30); "Foxey Lady", "In from the Storm" (Maui, July 30); "Freedom", "Voodoo Child" (Isle of Wight, August 30)
Hear My Train A Comin' (film 2012): "Message to Love", "Lover Man", "Purple Haze", "Voodoo Child" (New York Pop, July 17); "Killing Floor", "Spanish Castle Magic", "All Along the Watchtower", "Foxey Lady" (Love & Peace Festival, September 6)

Concerts

Footnotes

References

Bibliography

1970 concert tours
1970 in music
Concert tours of the United States
Concert tours of Europe
Jimi Hendrix